Ekkattuthangal Metro station is a Metro railway station on the Line 2 of the Chennai Metro, which is operational. The station is among the elevated stations coming up along corridor II of the Chennai Metro, Chennai Central–St. Thomas Mount stretch. The station will serve the neighbourhoods of Ekkattuthangal, West Mambalam, Guindy Industrial Estate and West Saidapet.

History

The station
The station is being constructed as an elevated station on the arterial Inner Ring Road. The station will have ground, concourse and platform levels.

Layout

Facilities

Connections
Metropolitan Transport Corporation (Chennai) bus routes number 10E, 18F, 18M, 70/70A, 70C, 70D, 70G, 70K, 70S, 70T, 70V, 70W, 77J, 111, 113, 114, 154E, 170, 170A, 170B, 170C, 170CET, 170G, 170K, 170L, 170M, 170P, 170S, 170T, 270J, 500C, 554B, 568C, 568T, 570, 570AC, 570S, A70, B70, D70, D70CUT, D70NS, D170, F70, G70, L18, L51, L70, M70, M70CNS, M70D, M70F, M70NS, M70S, M170T, M270, T70 serves the station from nearby Ekkattuthangal bus stand.

Commercial hub
Ekkattuthangal station is one of the five stations in the first phase of the Chennai Metro project identified to be converted into commercial hubs, the others being CMBT, Alandur, Arumbakkam, and Ashok Nagar. A 106,000 sq ft building with nine floors has been planned at the station, opposite Hilton Chennai hotel.

Entry/Exit

See also

References

External links
 

 UrbanRail.Net – descriptions of all metro systems in the world, each with a schematic map showing all stations.

Chennai Metro stations
Railway stations in Chennai